AAZ or Aaz may refer to:

 Amarasi language, a Malayo-Polynesian language of Indonesia
 Quetzaltenango Airport
 1.9 R4 TD 55kW, a discontinued automobile engine; see List of discontinued Volkswagen Group diesel engines